Distributed Computing is a peer reviewed scientific journal in the field of computer science, published by Springer. The journal covers the field of distributed computing, with contributions to the theory, specification, design, and implementation of distributed systems.

External links

Computer science journals
Publications established in 1986
Distributed computing
Springer Science+Business Media academic journals
Bimonthly journals